Nicola Jane Coffey (born 27 May 1982) is an Irish former cricketer who played as a right-handed batter and left-arm medium-fast bowler. She played nineteen Women's One Day Internationals and two Twenty20 Internationals for Ireland between 2003 and 2008, including being part of Ireland's squad for the 2005 Women's Cricket World Cup.

References

External links
 
 

1982 births
Living people
Irish women cricketers
Ireland women One Day International cricketers
Ireland women Twenty20 International cricketers
Cricketers from Dublin (city)